Cnides is a genus of beetles in the family Carabidae, containing the following species:

 Cnides angustatus (Solier, 1849)
 Cnides brevipennis Jeannel, 1938
 Cnides jeanneli Ueno, 1985
 Cnides longestriatus Emden, 1949
 Cnides longulus Jeannel, 1958
 Cnides obtusus Jeannel, 1958
 Cnides putzeysi Jeannel, 1927
 Cnides rostratus Motschulsky, 1862
 Cnides spinicollis Jeannel, 1937

References

Trechinae